Tako J. van Popta  (born May 29, 1953) is a Canadian politician who was elected to represent the riding of Langley—Aldergrove in the House of Commons of Canada in the 2019 Canadian federal election, and was re-elected in 2021.

van Popta serves as the Chair for the Conservative Caucus in British Columbia. He is also Deputy Shadow Minister for Public Safety and member of the Standing Committee on Public Safety and National Security.

Electoral record

References

External links
Tako van Popta - Members Website 

Living people
Conservative Party of Canada MPs
Members of the House of Commons of Canada from British Columbia
21st-century Canadian politicians
Lawyers in British Columbia
Trinity Western University alumni
University of British Columbia alumni
1953 births